St Winefride's Well is a well located in the town of Holywell, Flintshire, in Wales.  It claims to be the oldest continually visited pilgrimage site in Great Britain and is a grade I listed building and scheduled ancient monument. St Winefride's well is believed to be connected to St Mary's well and chapel in Cefn Meiriadog, Denbighshire.  It is one of the few locations mentioned by name in the anonymous medieval alliterative poem Sir Gawain and the Green Knight.

History 

The healing waters are said to cause miraculous cures, with continuous reports from the early medieval period, although the association with the veneration of St. Winefride cannot be traced to before the 12th century (the 1138 transfer of her relics to Shrewsbury).

In 12th-century hagiography, Saint Winifred is a virgin martyr, beheaded by Caradoc, a local prince, after she spurned his advances.  A spring rose from the ground at the spot where her head fell and she was later restored to life by her uncle, Saint Beuno.

The well is known as "the Lourdes of Wales" and is mentioned in an old rhyme as one of the Seven Wonders of Wales.

Richard I visited the site in 1189 to pray for the success of his crusade, and Henry V was said by Adam of Usk to have travelled there on foot from Shrewsbury in 1416.

In the late 15th century, Lady Margaret Beaufort built a chapel overlooking the well, which now opens onto a pool where visitors may bathe.

Some of the structures at the well date from the reign of King Henry VII or earlier. Later, King Henry VIII caused the shrine and saintly relics to be destroyed, but some have been recovered to be housed at Shrewsbury and Holywell.

In the 17th century, the well became known as a symbol of the survival of Catholic recusancy in Wales.  From early in their mission to England, the Jesuits supported the well. In 1605, many of those involved with the Gunpowder plot visited it with Father Edward Oldcorne to give thanks for his deliverance from cancer, or as some said, to plan the plot.

King James II of England is known to have visited the well with his wife Mary of Modena during 1686, after several failed attempts to produce an heir to the throne. Shortly after this visit, Mary became pregnant with a son, James.

Princess Victoria, staying in Holywell with her uncle King Leopold I of Belgium, visited the Well in 1828. After the Roman Catholic Relief Act 1829 was enacted, the Jesuit Order encouraged a renaissance of the pilgrimage to the Well.

The stonework of the chapel is covered with hundreds of graffiti, the initials of grateful pilgrims. Some inscriptions testify to cures received there.

In January 1917 the North Wales Chronicle and Advertiser reported that the spring's flow had ceased.

The Well gardens were acquired in 1930 following the removal of the former St Winefride's Brewery.

Birgitte, Duchess of Gloucester, visited the well in 2005. In July 2021 Charles, Prince of Wales visited the well.

Gallery

Modern day 
The creation of the Milwr mine drainage tunnel caused the well to run dry when tunnelling work broke into a flooded cavern for which the well was the main resurgence. To maintain a supply of water at the well which was used by local industries, water was subsequently pumped from a nearby lead mine.

During early 2019 the water flow of the spring was interrupted due to repair work.

The Shrine and Well are administered by Holywell Parish on behalf of the Catholic diocese of Wrexham. The adjacent Visitor Centre is the entrance to the Well. Bathing takes place in the exterior pool only.

See also
 St Winefride's Church, Holywell
 St Winifred's Well, Woolston

References

Further reading
T. W. Pritchard. St Winefride, Her Holy Well and the Jesuit Mission c. 660–1930. Bridge Books, 2009.
K. Hurlock. Medieval Welsh Pilgrimage, c. 1100-1500. New York, 2018. ISBN 978-1-137-43098-4 . https://doi.org/10.1057/978-1-137-43099-1
R. Turner. 'The architecture, patronage, and date of St Winefride's Well Holywell and the 'Stanley Churches''. Archaeologia Cambrensis. 169 (2020), 245-275.

External links
 St Winefride's Well – official site
 Holywell Tourism: St Winefride's Well
 St Winefride's Holy Well
 St. Winifred's Well information at Castlewales.com
 Notes on the site's history including souvenir postcards featuring heaped pilgrims' crutches left behind after miraculous cures

Buildings and structures in Flintshire
Winefride's Well, St
Catholic pilgrimage sites
Springs of Wales
Bodies of water of Flintshire
Tourist attractions in Flintshire
Museums in Flintshire
Religious museums in Wales
Landmarks in Wales
Grade I listed buildings in Flintshire
Catholic Church in Wales
Roman Catholic shrines in the United Kingdom
Mary of Modena